Glamour Kills was a clothing company based in Manhattan, New York. The company was closely associated with emo musical artists, and its shirt with a stylized flying pig was called "iconic" by The Daily Edge.

The company was started in 2006, by Mark Capicotto and made its debut at The Bamboozle Festival in the spring.

The company worked with bands such as: All Time Low, Cobra Starship, Mayday Parade, We The Kings, The Wonder Years, and New Found Glory.

References

External links 
Official site

Clothing companies of the United States